Sri Katthukonda Ayyanar Temple is a historic Hindu temple located on the Sundarapandiapuram,  Near Tenkasi Town, Tamil Nadu, India. It is dedicated to Ayyanar named sri Katthukonda Ayyanar. The temple forms the heart and lifeline of the 500 year old Tenkasi Town. Vishwakarma (caste). It is now maintained by the people belonging to Vishwakarma, Vanniyar Padayachi (caste) community from Rajapalayam, Vasudevanalloor, Tenkasi, Sundarapandiapuram, Surandai Vishwakarma. People from these towns meet together on every Sri Maha Shivarathri Pooja for their Kulatheiva (clan god).

The local people believes that this temple is more powerful, it solves their problems and it will help to achieve their needs and aim.

References

Kathukonda Ayyanar Temple
Sundarapandiapuram, Tamil Nadu
https://goo.gl/maps/1fmcupVdzyM2

Hindu temples in Tirunelveli district